Naghan (also Romanized as Nāghān) is a city in Naghan District of Kiar County, Chaharmahal and Bakhtiari province, Iran. At the 2006 census, its population was 4,928 in 1,210 households, when it was in Ardal County. The following census in 2011 counted 4,861 people in 1,345 households, by which time the city was in the newly established Kiar County. The latest census in 2016 showed a population of 6,125 people in 1,842 households. The city is populated by Lurs.

References 

Kiar County

Cities in Chaharmahal and Bakhtiari Province

Populated places in Chaharmahal and Bakhtiari Province

Populated places in Kiar County

Luri settlements in Chaharmahal and Bakhtiari Province